Březnice is a municipality and village in Zlín District in the Zlín Region of the Czech Republic. It has about 1,400 inhabitants.

Notable people
Theodor Kohn (1845–1915), Archbishop of Olomouc

References

Villages in Zlín District